Anna Polinari (born 7 February 1999) is an Italian sprinter,

Career
Selected to be part of the Italian athletics team for the Tokyo 2020 Olympics, as a possible member of the relay team.
She studies Sports Science at the University of Verona and is trained by ex 800m runner Fabio Lotti.

References

External links
 

1999 births
Living people
Italian female sprinters
Sportspeople from Verona
20th-century Italian women
21st-century Italian women
Athletes (track and field) at the 2022 Mediterranean Games
Mediterranean Games gold medalists in athletics
Mediterranean Games gold medalists for Italy
Athletics competitors of Centro Sportivo Carabinieri